The 2001 IIHF World U20 Championship, commonly referred as the 2001 World Junior Hockey Championships (2001 WJHC), was the 25th edition of the Ice Hockey World Junior Championship. The tournament was held in Moscow and Podolsk, Russia from December 26, 2000 to January 5, 2001. The Czech Republic won the gold medal for the second consecutive year with a 2–1 victory over Finland in the championship game, while Canada won the bronze medal with a 2–1 overtime victory over Sweden.

Venues

Rosters

Top Division

Preliminary round

Group A

All times local (MSK/UTC+3).

Group B

All times local (MSK/UTC+3).

Relegation round
Source:

 was relegated to Division I for the 2002 World Junior Ice Hockey Championships.

Final round
Source:

† Overtime victory.

Quarterfinals

Consolation round

Semifinals

7th place game

5th place game

Bronze medal game

Gold medal game

Scoring leaders

Goaltending leaders
Minimum 90 minutes played.

Tournament awards

Final standings

Division I
The Division I tournament was played in Landsberg and Füssen, Germany between December 10 and December 16, 2000.

Preliminary round

Group A

Group B

Final round

 was promoted to the Top Division for the 2002 World Junior Ice Hockey Championships.

Relegation round

 was relegated to Division II for the 2002 World Junior Ice Hockey Championships.

Division II
The Division II tournament was played in Elektrėnai and Kaunas, Lithuania between December 30, 2000 and January 3, 2001.

Preliminary round

Group A

Group B

Final round
Source:

All times local (EET/UTC+2).

7th place game

 was relegated to Division III for the 2002 World Junior Ice Hockey Championships.

5th place game

3rd place game

1st place game

 was promoted to Division I for the 2002 World Junior Ice Hockey Championships.

Division III
The Division III tournament was played in Belgrade, Federal Republic of Yugoslavia between January 4 and January 8, 2001.

Preliminary round

Group A

Group B

Final round
Source:

All times local (EET/UTC+2).

7th place game

 was relegated to Division III Qualification for the 2002 World Junior Ice Hockey Championships, but did not participate again until 2003.

5th place game

3rd place game

1st place game

 was promoted to Division II for the 2002 World Junior Ice Hockey Championships.

Division III Qualification
The Division III qualification tournament was played in Luxembourg City, Luxembourg between April 26 and April 28, 2001.

 was promoted to Division III of the 2002 World Junior Ice Hockey Championships.

References

 
World Junior Ice Hockey Championships
World Junior Ice Hockey Championships
2001
I
World Junior Ice Hockey Championships
World Junior Ice Hockey Championships
World Junior Ice Hockey Championships
World Junior Ice Hockey Championships
World Junior Ice Hockey Championships
Sports competitions in Bavaria
World Junior Championships
Sports competitions in Kaunas
20th century in Kaunas
Sport in Elektrėnai
World Junior Championships
International sports competitions in Belgrade
2000s in Belgrade
World Junior Championships
International ice hockey competitions hosted by Yugoslavia
International ice hockey competitions hosted by Lithuania
International ice hockey competitions hosted by Germany